John Ray (September 8, 1911 – June 28, 1957) was an American Negro league outfielder in the 1930s and 1940s.

A native of Williamson County, Tennessee, Ray made his Negro leagues debut in 1932 for the Montgomery Grey Sox. In his final season, 1945, he played for the Kansas City Monarchs alongside Baseball Hall of Famer Jackie Robinson. Ray died in Nashville, Tennessee in 1957 at age 45.

References

External links
 and Seamheads

1911 births
1957 deaths
Birmingham Black Barons players
Cleveland Bears players
Indianapolis Clowns players
Jacksonville Red Caps players
Kansas City Monarchs players
Montgomery Grey Sox players
Baseball outfielders
Baseball players from Tennessee
People from Williamson County, Tennessee
20th-century African-American sportspeople